The following is a list of the classes in each phylum of the kingdom Animalia. There are 107 classes of animals in 33 phyla in this list. However, different sources give different numbers of classes and phyla. For example, Protura, Diplura, and Collembola are often considered to be the three orders in the class Entognatha. This list should by no means be considered complete and authoritative and should be used carefully.

Acanthocephala (thorny-headed worms)
Archiacanthocephala
Eoacanthocephala
Palaeacanthocephala (ancient thornheads)

Acoelomorpha (simple soft-bodied flatworms)
Acoela
Nemertodermatida

Annelida (segmented worms)

Clitellata (earthworms)
Polychaeta (bristle worms)
Sipuncula (peanut worms)

Arthropoda (arthropods: insects, crustaceans, arachnids, centipedes, and millipedes)

Chelicerata
Arachnida (spiders, scorpions, and kin)
Xiphosura (horseshoe crabs)
Pycnogonida (sea spiders)

Crustacea
Branchiopoda (fairy shrimp, tadpole shrimp, water fleas, and clam shrimp)
Cephalocarida (horseshoe shrimp)
Pentastomida (tongue worms)
Branchiura (fish lice)
Mystacocarida
Copepoda
Ostracoda (seed shrimp)
Malacostraca (crabs, lobsters, crayfish, krill, various shrimp, woodlice, and kin)
Thecostraca (barnacles)
Remipedia

Hexapoda
Entognatha (coneheads, two-pronged bristletails and springtails)
Insecta (insects)

Myriapoda
Chilopoda (centipedes)
Diplopoda (millipedes)
Pauropoda
Symphyla (pseudocentipedes)

Brachiopoda ("lamp shells")
Lingulata
Craniata
Rhynchonellata

Bryozoa (moss animals)
Gymnolaemata
Phylactolaemata
Stenolaemata

Chaetognatha (arrow worms)
Archisagittoidea
Sagittoidea

Chordata (vertebrates, tunicates, and lancelets)

Cephalochordata
Leptocardii (lancelet)

Tunicata
Appendicularia (larvaceans)
Ascidiacea (sea squirts)
Sorberacea
Thaliacea (salps, pyrosomes, and doliolids)

Vertebrata

Agnatha

Cyclostomata
Myxini (hagfish)
Petromyzontida (lamprey)

Gnathostomata

Chondrichthyes (cartilaginous fish: chimeras, sharks and rays)

Osteichthyes
Actinopterygii (ray-finned fish, which includes most familiar bony fish)
Sarcopterygii
Actinistia (coelacanths)
Dipnoi (lungfish)
Tetrapoda
 Amphibia (amphibians)
 Amniota
 Mammalia (mammals)
 Aves (birds)
 Reptilia (reptiles, paraphyletic with respect to Aves)

Cnidaria (marine stinging animals)
Octocorallia
Hexacorallia
Ceriantharia
Cubozoa (box jellyfish)
Hydrozoa (hydroids)
Myxozoa (marine parasites)
Scyphozoa (true jellyfish)
Staurozoa (stalked jellyfish)
Polypodiozoa (marine parasites)

Cycliophora (tiny marine animals)
Eucycliophora

Dicyemida (rhombozoa)
Dicyemida

Echinodermata (starfish, sea urchins, sand dollars, sea lilies, and others)

Crinozoa
Crinoidea (sea lilies and feather stars)

Asterozoa
Asteroidea (star fish)
Ophiuroidea (brittle stars)

Echinozoa
Echinoidea  (sea urchins)
Holothuroidea (sea cucumbers)

Entoprocta
Entoprocta

Gastrotricha (hairybacks)
Gastrotricha

Gnathostomulida (jaw worms)
Gnathostomulida

Hemichordata 
Enteropneusta (acorn worms)
Pterobranchia

Kinorhyncha (mud dragons)
Kinorhyncha

Loricifera
Loricifera

Mollusca (mollusks)
Aplacophora
Bivalvia (clams, mussels, scallops, and kin)
Cephalopoda (octopuses, squids and cuttlefish)
Gastropoda (snails and slugs)
Monoplacophora
Polyplacophora (chitons, or sea cradles)
Scaphopoda (tusk shells)

Micrognathozoa
Micrognathozoa

Nematoda (roundworms)
Chromadorea
Enoplea
Secernentea

Nematomorpha (horsehair worms)
Gordioidea
Nectonematoida

Nemertea (ribbon worms)
Anopla
Enopla

Onychophora (velvet worms)
Udeonychophora

Orthonectida
Orthonectida

Placozoa
Trichoplacoidea

Platyhelminthes (flatworms)
Cestoda (tapeworms and relatives)
Monogenea
Trematoda (flukes)
Turbellaria (e.g. Dugesia)

Porifera (sponges)
Calcarea (calcareous sponges)
Demospongiae
Hexactinellida (glass sponges)
Homoscleromorpha

Priapulida (priapulid worms)
Halicryptomorpha
Priapulimorpha
Seticoronaria

Rotifera (rotifers)
Bdelloidea
Monogononta
Seisonidea

Tardigrada (tardigrades, water bears, or moss piglets)
Eutardigrada
Heterotardigrada

Xenoturbellida
Xenoturbellida

References

Taxonomic lists